Bernard H. Rogers, known as B. H. "Johnny" Rogers (October 5, 1905 – April 23, 1977), was a Louisiana politician who served in the Louisiana House of Representatives and the Louisiana State Senate.

References

 

 
 

1905 births
1977 deaths
People from DeSoto Parish, Louisiana
Democratic Party members of the Louisiana House of Representatives
Democratic Party Louisiana state senators
Louisiana city council members
Columbia University alumni
Louisiana State University faculty
Businesspeople from Louisiana
Farmers from Louisiana
United States Army personnel of World War II
United States Army colonels
Square dance
Burials in Louisiana
20th-century American businesspeople
20th-century American politicians